Brewster (2004–2017) was Britain's longest serving police dog. He was an English Springer Spaniel, handled by PC Dave Pert working for the Bedfordshire, Cambridgeshire and Hertfordshire Police Dog Unit.

References

Detection dogs
2004 animal births
2017 animal deaths
Police dogs
Individual dogs